Takács Zoltán (born December 17, 1979) is Hungarian musician and record producer, best known internationally as the keyboardist of the Hungarian alternative rock band Heaven Street Seven and the producer of Ivan & The Parazol's Mama Don't You Recognize Ivan & The Parazol.

Life and career
Takács was born in 1979 in Hódmezővásárhely, Hungary. He attended the Márton Bálint elementary and secondary school in Törökbálint. He continued his studies at the Károli Gáspár University of the Reformed Church in Hungary at the Faculty of Far Eastern languages studying Japanese. He was nicknamed Japán (Japanese in Hungarian) by his fellows because of his unique choice of language studying.

Heaven Street Seven

In 1998 Takács joined the Budapest based alternative rock band Heaven Street Seven and has been the keyboardist for the band since then.

Production career
Takács started his record producer career by recording, mixing and mastering Heaven Street Seven's Szállj Ki és Gyalogolj in 2004 in Budapest at the Acquarium studios.

Discography
Heaven Street Seven
Tick Tock No Fear (1995)
Goal (1997)
Budapest Dolls (1998)
Cukor (2000)
Kisfilmek a nagyvilágból (2002)
Szállj Ki És Gyalogolj (2004)
Tick Tock No Fear (2005)
Tudom, Hogy Szeretsz Titokban (2006)
Sordid Little Symphonies (2007)
Jazz (2008)

Soerii & Poolek
Ua-mua (2010)
Elton John (2010)

Production
2004: Heaven Street Seven – Szállj Ki és Gyalogolj
2007: 30Y – Semmi Szédítő Magasság
2008: Heaven Street Seven – Jazz
2010: 30Y – Városember
2011: Supernem – Tudományos Fantasztikus Pop
2011: Fran Palermo – Museum of Clouds
2012: Heaven Street Seven – Felkeltem A Reggelt
2011: Óriás – Gondalapos
2012: Odett – Hanyatt, Homlok, Egyenes
2012: 30Y – Szentimentálé
2012: Ivan & The Parazol – Mama Don't You Recognize Ivan & The Parazol
2012: Fran Palermo – Natural Cash
2013: Óriás – Tűz, Víz, Repülő

Personal life
In 2014 Erika Anikó Brouwer, Takács's partner, gave birth to their first child, Ábel Takács-Brouwer.

See also
Heaven Street Seven
Hungarian alternative
Budapest indie music scene
Hungarian metal
Hungarian pop
Hungarian rock
Notable Hungarian producers

References

External links
Zoltán Takács at Discogs

1979 births
Living people
Musicians from Budapest
People from Törökbálint
Hungarian indie rock musicians